Raúl Caballero Cabrera (born 3 December 1978) is a Spanish retired footballer who played as a forward.

He previously played for Barcelona B and Villarreal in the Segunda División and for numerous teams at a lower level.

References

External links
 
 Futbolme profile  

1978 births
Living people
People from Badalona
Sportspeople from the Province of Barcelona
Spanish footballers
Footballers from Catalonia
Association football forwards
FC Barcelona Atlètic players
Villarreal CF players
FC Cartagena footballers
Elche CF players
UE Lleida players
UDA Gramenet footballers
Girona FC players
CF Badalona players
Alicante CF footballers
CE L'Hospitalet players
Segunda División players
Segunda División B players
Tercera División players
Divisiones Regionales de Fútbol players
CF Damm players